Amblyscirtes elissa, the elissa roadside skipper, is a species of grass skipper in the butterfly family Hesperiidae. It is found in Central America and North America.

Subspecies
These two subspecies belong to the species Amblyscirtes elissa:
 Amblyscirtes elissa arizonae H. Freeman, 1993
 Amblyscirtes elissa elissa Godman, 1900

References

Further reading

External links

 

Hesperiinae
Articles created by Qbugbot
Butterflies described in 1900